George Vincent Homeier (October 5, 1930 – June 25, 2017), known professionally as Skip Homeier, was an American actor who started his career at the age of eleven and became a child star.

Career

Child actor
Homeier was born in Chicago, Illinois on October 5, 1930. He began to act for radio shows at the age of six as Skippy Homeier. At the age of 11, he worked on the radio show Portia Faces Life as well as making "dramatic commercial announcements" on The O'Neills and Against the Storm. In 1942, he joined the casts of Wheatena Playhouse and We, the Abbotts. From 1943 until 1944, he played the role of Emil in the Broadway play and film Tomorrow, the World!. Cast as a child indoctrinated into Nazism who is brought to the United States from Germany following the death of his parents, Homeier was praised for his performance. He played the troubled youngster in the film adaptation of Tomorrow, the World! (1944) and received good reviews playing opposite Fredric March and Betty Field as his American uncle and aunt.

Adult roles
Homeier changed his first name from Skippy to Skip when he turned eighteen. He attended the University of California, Los Angeles.

Although Homeier worked frequently throughout his childhood and adolescence, playing wayward youths with no chance of redemption, he did not become a major star; but he did make a transition from child actor to adult, especially in a range of roles as delinquent youths, common in Hollywood films of the 1950s.  Some of these films were Film noir works. 

He also developed a talent for playing strong character roles in war films, such as Halls of Montezuma (1950), Sam Fuller's Fixed Bayonets! (1951) and Beachhead (1954).

In 1954, he guest-starred in an episode of the NBC legal drama Justice, based on cases of the Legal Aid Society of New York. He was cast later in an episode of Steve McQueen's Wanted Dead or Alive, a CBS Western series. Homeier played a man sought for a crime of which he is innocent, but who has no faith in the legal system's ability to provide justice. Fleeing from McQueen's bounty hunter character Josh Randall, Homeier's character's foot slips and he accidentally falls to his death from a cliff.

He appeared in a 1955 episode of Alfred Hitchcock Presents, with co-star Joanne Woodward entitled "Momentum". Homeier appeared as Kading in an episode of the NBC western Jefferson Drum ("The Post", 1958), starring Jeff Richards. In 1959, he appeared as a drover named Lucky in Rawhide, Incident of the Blue Fire. In 1960, Skip appeared on an episode of The Rifleman: The Spoiler as Brud Evans. Then, from 1960 to 1961, he starred in the title role in Dan Raven, a short-lived NBC crime drama set on Sunset Strip of West Hollywood, California, with a number of celebrities playing themselves in guest roles. The series only lasted for thirteen episodes. In the summer of 1961, he appeared in an episode of The Asphalt Jungle, and later that same year, he performed as a replacement drover and temporary "ramrod" in an episode of Rawhide ("Incident of the Long Shakedown").
Homeier was also cast as “Wichita Kid “ in a Rawhide episode airing November 23, 1965 entitled Brush War at Buford.

Homeier also made two guest appearances on Perry Mason, both times as the defendant. In 1961, he played Dr. Edley in "The Case of the Pathetic Patient", and in 1965, he played the police sergeant Dave Wolfe in "The Case of the Silent Six". In 1964, he guest-starred in The Addams Family episode "Halloween with the Addams Family" with Don Rickles. Also in 1964, he portrayed Dr. Roy Clinton in The Outer Limits episode "Expanding Human" (1963). In a very busy year, he also appeared in the Combat! episode "The Impostor" (1964, S3 E10). He also appeared in the Combat! episode "Night Patrol" (1963, S1 E22) as Lt. Billy Joe Cranston.

Homeier was cast as Doc Holliday in the 1964 episode, "The Quiet and the Fury" on Death Valley Days. In a 1965 Death Valley Days episode, "Fighting Sky Pilot", hosted by Ronald Reagan, Homeier played a pastor, Ben Darniell, in Carson City, Nevada. In the storyline, the minister Darniell attempts to rescue a saloon girl, Claire Vernon (Carol Brewster), from her oppressive employer.

Homeier was cast in the feature film The Ghost and Mr. Chicken (1966) with Don Knotts; and he continued to be frequently cast on television as a guest star, often as a villain, including in all four of Irwin Allen's science-fiction series in the mid-to-late 1960s. He guest-starred as well on Star Trek: The Original Series in two episodes: as the Nazi-like character Melakon in "Patterns of Force" (1968), as Dr. Rota Sevrin in "The Way to Eden" (1969), and in Longstreet (1971). In 1969 he was a guest star on the TV show Mannix, in the third season episode called "A Sleep in the Deep". One of his last roles was a one-liner in the television film The Wild Wild West Revisited (1979) as a senior Secret Service official. He retired from acting aged 50.

Death
Homeier died on June 25, 2017 at the age of 86 from spinal myelopathy at his home in Indian Wells, California. He is survived by his wife, Della, and his sons Peter and Michael from his first marriage (1951–1962) to Nancy Van Noorden Field.

Selected filmography

Tomorrow, the World! (1944) - Emil Bruckner
Boys' Ranch (1946) - Skippy
Arthur Takes Over (1948) - Arthur Bixby
Mickey (1948) - Hank Evans
The Big Cat (1949) - Jim Hawks - Gil's Son
The Gunfighter (1950) - Hunt Bromley
Halls of Montezuma (1951) - Pretty Boy
Sealed Cargo (1951) - Steve
Fixed Bayonets! (1951) - Whitey
Sailor Beware (1952) - Mac
Has Anybody Seen My Gal? (1952) - Carl Pennock
The Last Posse (1953) - Art Romer
Beachhead (1954) - Reynolds
The Lone Gun (1954) - Cass Downing
Dawn at Socorro (1954) - Buddy Ferris
Black Widow (1954) - John Amberly
Cry Vengeance (1954) - Roxey Davis
Ten Wanted Men (1955) - Howie Stewart
The Road to Denver (1955) - Sam Mayhew
At Gunpoint (1955) - Bob Dennis
Stranger at My Door (1956) - Clay Anderson
Dakota Incident (1956) - Frank Banner
Thunder Over Arizona (1956) - Tim Mallory
The Burning Hills (1956) - Jack Sutton
Between Heaven and Hell (1956) - Pvt. Swanson - Co. G
The Human Barrier (1957) - Capt. Gene LiptonNo Road Back (1957) - John RailtonThe Tall T (1957) - Billy JackDay of the Badman (1958) - Howard HayesPlunderers of Painted Flats (1959) - Joe MartinComanche Station (1960) - FrankThe Rifleman (1960, TV Series) - Brud EvansStark Fear (1962) - Gerald WinslowThe Virginian (1963 episode A Portrait of Marie Valonne) - Sgt. Bohannon (1965) - The Brazos Kid 
(1969 episode) Price of Love - foremanShowdown (1963) - CaslonCombat! (1963 episode - "Night Patrol") - Billy JoeBullet for a Badman (1964) - PinkCombat! (1964 episode - "The Imposter") - Sgt. MorganThe Outer Limits (1964 episode - "Expanding Human") - Dr. Roy ClintonThe Ghost and Mr. Chicken (1966) - Ollie Weaver
’’Voyage to the Bottom of the Sea’’ (1966 episode - “The Day the World Ended”) - Senator William DennisCombat! (1967 episode - "Entombed") - Lt. Karl Mauer
"Patterns of Force" (Star Trek episode, 1968) - Deputy Führer Melakon
"The Way to Eden" (Star Trek episode, 1969) - Dr. Rota SevrinTiger by the Tail (1970) - Deputy Sheriff LaswellStarbird and Sweet William (1973) - RangerHelter Skelter (1976, television movie) - Judge OlderThe Greatest (1977) - Major The Incredible Hulk (1979) - Dr. Robert StanleyShowdown at Eagle Gap'' (1982) - Alexander Kirk (final film role)

References

External links

 
 
 

1930 births
2017 deaths
American male child actors
American male film actors
American male radio actors
American male stage actors
American male television actors
Male actors from Chicago
Male actors from Los Angeles
20th-century American male actors